Al-Halawiyah Madrasa is a madrasah complex located in al-Jalloum district of the Ancient city of Aleppo, Syria. It is built in 1124 on the site of Aleppo's Great Byzantine Cathedral of Saint Helena of the 5th century, where, according to tradition, a Roman temple once stood. Saint Helena, mother of Constantine the Great, built a great Byzantine cathedral there.

When the Crusaders were pillaging the surrounding countryside during the siege of Aleppo in 1124, the city's chief judge,  Ibn al-Khashshab, started to convert the cathedral into a mosque during the reign of Belek Ghazi. In 1149, Nur al-Din converted the building into a madrasah; an Islamic-religious school  for the followers of the Hanafi madhab.

Parts of the 5th century Christian construction were turned into an Islamic school. It is also known for its fine mihrab.

See also
 Al-Firdaws Madrasa
 Al-Sultaniyah Madrasa
 Al-Uthmaniyah Madrasa
 Al-Zahiriyah Madrasa
 Khusruwiyah Mosque
 Ancient City of Aleppo

References

5th-century churches
12th-century mosques
Religious buildings and structures converted into mosques
Byzantine sacred architecture
Former churches in Syria
Madrasas in Aleppo
Religious buildings and structures completed in 1124
12th-century madrasas